Zhaobao taijiquan (pronounced jao-bao) is a style of taijiquan that is often considered to be a modern style, but actually has a strong documented lineage that confirms its authenticity as an ancient style of taijiquan and as a true transmission from Wang Zongyue.

Form and Characteristics
The main set of Zhaobao Taijiquan, or Zhaobao Jia, consists of 108 movements in the big frame and 75 refined movements in the small frame progressing in difficulty. Great emphasis is placed on Yi (mind/intent) in Zhaobao training. Like many other styles, Zhaobao Jia can be practiced at three heights, each providing a different degree of complexity. Generally students begin with the Middle Frame (Ren Pan Jia), progress to the Low Frame (Pan Gong Jia) and end with the High Frame (Dai Li Jia).

Zhaobao Taijiquan's practical applications rely heavily on spiral uprooting techniques controlled through the use of Qinna, often followed with the use of sweeps or trips to bring the opponent to the ground. Flowing and coordinated techniques conform successfully to the basic tenets of the T'ai ch'i ch'uan Classics.

Zhaobao Taijiquan also has its own Neigong system based on traditional Daoist practice that enables the practitioner to develop the required physical and mental skills needed for successful mastery of the art.

History and Lineage
The Zhaobao Taijiquan style shares many similarities with Chen-style taijiquan, and this commonality is considered by the school to be the manifestation of influences introduced by a member of the famed Chen family- Chen Qingping. 

Zhaobao Taijiquan is not a family style (although there exists the He Family offshoot) and has traditionally been passed down from master to a chosen disciple. The Zhaobao name is given to the style as a way of honouring the village in which the art was kept for many centuries; Zhaobao Village in Wenxian County, Henan Province, China.

According to the style's tradition, Chen Qingping was the 7th generation master from the time that the grand master Jiang Fa brought the style taught to him by Wang Zongyue to the local area in Wenxian County.

Zhaobao Taijiquan's lineage down to Chen Qingping is as below:

T'ai chi ch'uan lineage tree with Zhaobao focus

Notes

References

Bibliography
Peng, Wen. Zhao Bao Tai Chi Kung Fu, USA Tai Chi Culture Association. 
Zheng, Wuqing. Wudang Zhaobao Taijiquan Small Frame, Da Zhan Publishing Company, Taiwan.  (only available in Chinese)

External links
 USA Tai Chi Culture Association Includes history and lineage of Zhao Bao Tai Chi
 Chenstyle.com This resource guide to Chen and related styles has a description and short video of middle frame Zhaobao Jia
 A guide to the history, lineage, contents and description of Zhao Bao Taijiquan
(Wayback Machine copy)

Tai chi styles
Neijia